Adailton Pereira dos Santos (born 18 April 1973), better known as Ady,  is a retired footballer who last played for MyPa in Finnish Veikkausliiga. Born in Caatiba, Bahia, Brazil, Ady represented the Tunisia national team.

Career
He started his career when a child in Arthur Leite stadium in his hometown. When teenager started to be noted as good soccer player in local championship called Liga Desportiva Caatibense and latter he moved with his agent's help to Itambé, when he played for Itambé's soccer team. Latter he was hired by Poções soccer team to dispute Bahia's state soccer championship. After a good performance in this championship he signed signed a contract with Esporte Clube Bahia and then his career reached the national scope.

He also played for the Santa Cruz, Madureira and Goiás Football Club. And then became part of Santos FC, in which he played 15 matches in the Brazilian Championship of 1998. In 1999, he transferred to the Portuguesa team, but it didn't last long.

Little used in "Lusa do Canindé", he received a proposal from Tunisian football. He accepted, traveled and began his international career. With a solid career and notoriety at Espérance de Tunis, he became naturalized and played for the national team of that country, playing in the World Cup qualifiers and with the intention of playing in the 2002 FIFA World Cup, but ended up not being called up for the World Cup.

After leaving Espérance, Ady played, from 2003 to 2005, for Al Ahly Tripoli in Lybia. In 2005, he started his career in Finland, playing for TPS until 2007; then at JJK Jyväskylä in 2008 and from 2009 to 2010 at MyPa, where he would end his career at the age of 37.

References
 Guardian Football

Living people
1973 births
Tunisian footballers
Tunisia international footballers
Brazilian footballers
Brazilian emigrants to Tunisia
Expatriate footballers in Finland
Expatriate footballers in Libya
Expatriate footballers in Saudi Arabia
Veikkausliiga players
Saudi Professional League players
Myllykosken Pallo −47 players
Turun Palloseura footballers
JJK Jyväskylä players
Espérance Sportive de Tunis players
Al-Qadsiah FC players
Brazilian expatriate sportspeople in Finland
Brazilian expatriate sportspeople in Saudi Arabia
Association football midfielders
Brazilian expatriate sportspeople in Libya
Tunisian expatriate sportspeople in Finland
Tunisian expatriate sportspeople in Libya
Tunisian expatriate sportspeople in Saudi Arabia